The Wells score may refer to one of two clinical prediction rules in clinical medicine:

 Wells score for deep vein thrombosis
 Wells' score for pulmonary embolism